A number of individuals have achieved the rare distinction of serving in all three branches of the state government of one of the U.S. states:

 in the executive branch (in an elected position, such as governor or state attorney general), or in a high-level state appointed position (such as a member of the governor's cabinet, head of a state agency, or member of a state executive board or commission);
 in the state legislature; and
 as a state judge.

This list excludes service in local government (such as county or city government), as well as military and militia posts.

List

See also
List of people who have served in all three branches of the United States federal government
List of people who have held multiple United States Cabinet-level positions
List of United States Supreme Court Justices who also served in Congress

Notes

References

Three Branches State
Lists of state political office-holders in the United States
State government in the United States
State political office-holders in the United States